Kumluca is a town and district of Antalya Province on the Mediterranean coast of Turkey, part of the Turkish Riviera. Its neighbour towns are Korkuteli, Elmalı, Finike, Kemer and Antalya

The town of Kumluca, formerly the village of Sarıkavak, is named for its sandy soil (kum meaning sand in Turkish), good for growing watermelons.

Geography
The centre of the district is a plain pointing north from the Mediterranean coast and surrounded by mountains on three sides. The northern part of the district is hilly and mountainous. Summers are hot and dry, winters cool and wet as one would expect in a Mediterranean district. The coast never gets snow, though it snows in the mountains. In this climate fruit and vegetables can be grown under glass all year round and this is the mainstay of the local economy, along with orange trees. Kumluca is a wealthy district.

History
In the last years of the Seljuqs of Rum, silver coins were minted in the town. Between 1282 and 1302, the town struck dirhams under Kaykhusraw III, Kayqubad III, and Mesud II with the mint name Sarıkavak (Sārūqawāq)

Archaeologists have found a shipwreck dating back to the 15th-16th B.C 50 meters away from the coast of Kumluca district in early April in 2019. Archaeologist Hakan Öniz has published an article about this research in the journal Palestine Exploration Quarterly. He announced that a new Bronze Age shipwreck had been discovered in the same coast where the Gelidonya and Uluburun shipwrecks were found and this finding belongs to earlier times than both of them.

Greek Families lived in the village together with the Turks of the village and the Greek families left during the Greek-Turkish population exchange.

Demographics

The district has a population of 65,652 according to the 2010 census. The town itself has 31.525 inhabitants. Kumluca has 3 municipalities (Beykonak, Çavuşköy and Mavikent) and 24 villages.

The population of inhabited places are shown in the table(Municipalities are shown in bold)

Tourism
There are a number of important historical sites in the district of Kumluca including Olympos, Kitanaura, Korydalla, Rhodiapolis, Idebessos and Gagai; of these Olympos is the largest and attracts the most visitors.

West of Mavikent there is less development but taken as a whole Kumluca is one of the fastest growing local economies in Turkey.

References

External links 
 District governor's official website 
 District municipality's official website 
 Information on Kumluca

Populated places in Antalya Province
Populated coastal places in Turkey
Districts of Antalya Province
Kumluca District